, known internationally as Sonny Chiba, was a Japanese actor and martial artist. Chiba was one of the first actors to achieve stardom through his skills in martial arts, initially in Japan and later before an international audience.

Born in Fukuoka, Chiba played a variety of sports in high school, including baseball and volleyball. He also practiced gymnastics and participated at the National Sports Festival of Japan in his third year. When he was a university student, he learned martial arts, earning a black belt in Kyokushin Karate in 1965 and later receiving a fourth degree in 1984.

Chiba's career began in the 1960s, when he starred in two tokusatsu superhero shows. In his first role, he replaced Susumu Wajima as the main character Kōtarō Ran/Seven Color Mask in Seven Color Mask (Nana-iro kamen) in the second half of the series. However, his breakthrough role was in the 1974 film The Street Fighter. Before retiring, Chiba had starred in Kill Bill: Volume 1, and The Fast and the Furious: Tokyo Drift.

Chiba died from the complications of COVID-19 Delta variant on 19 August 2021, at age 82.

Names 
Born , he used the stage name "Chiba Shinichi" throughout his professional career. When New Line Cinema released the film  in the United States in 1974, they retitled it The Street Fighter and billed its star as Sonny Chiba. Later, Chiba modified the name to "JJ Sonny Chiba", wherein the initials stood for "Justice Japan".

Early life 
Chiba was born in Fukuoka, the third of five children. His father was a pilot for the Imperial Japanese Army Air Service; his mother, originally from Kumamoto Prefecture, had competed in track and field in her youth. When he was four years old, his father was transferred to Kisarazu, Chiba, and the family moved to Kimitsu, Chiba Prefecture.

After Chiba went to junior high school in Kimitsu, the physical education teacher advised him to do artistic gymnastics. He also was passionate about track and field sports, baseball, and volleyball. He participated in those four sports championships of Chiba Prefecture. In high school, Chiba dedicated himself to artistic gymnastics and won the National Sports Festival of Japan while in his third year. He enjoyed watching movies, including Western movies such as Shane and High Noon.

Chiba went to the Nippon Sport Science University in 1957. He was a serious candidate for a place in the Japanese Olympic team in his late teens until he was sidelined by a back injury. While he was a university student, he began studying martial arts with the renowned Kyokushin Karate master Masutatsu "Mas" Oyama (whom he later portrayed in a trilogy of films), which led to a first-degree black belt on 15 October 1965, later receiving a fourth-degree on 20 January 1984.

Career 

Sometime around 1960, he was discovered in a talent search (called "New Face") by the Toei film studio, and he began his screen career soon after.  The CEO of Toei at the time gave him the stage name "Shinichi Chiba".

His acting career began on television, starring in two tokusatsu superhero shows, first replacing Susumu Wajima as the main character Kōtarō Ran/ Seven Color Mask in Seven Color Mask (Nana-iro kamen) in the second half of the series and then starring as Gorō Narumi/Messenger of Allah in Messenger of Allah (Allah no Shisha). He starred in the 1961 science fiction movie Invasion of the Neptune Men and the first Kinji Fukasaku film, Drifting Detective: Tragedy in the Red Valley, which marked the beginning of a long series of collaborations for the two. Over the next decade, he was cast primarily in crime thrillers. Today the organization is known as Japan Action Enterprise (JAE). He starred in Karate Kiba (Bodyguard Kiba) in 1973, which was his first martial arts movie. Chiba's breakthrough international hit was The Street Fighter (1974) which was brought to Western audiences (dubbed in English) by New Line Cinema. The film and its sequels established him as the reigning Japanese martial arts actor in international cinema for the next two decades. It was New Line Cinema founder Robert Shaye who gave Chiba the English name "Sonny", which Chiba would adopt as his own (mostly for non-Japanese projects) from that point on.

Chiba's subsequent projects included such pictures as The Bullet Train (1975), Karate Warriors (1976), Doberman Cop (1977), Golgo 13: Assignment Kowloon (1977), and The Assassin (1977). He also occasionally returned to the science fiction genre, in movies such as Message from Space (1978). He also began to star on some jidaigeki such as Shogun's Samurai (1978), The Fall of Ako Castle (1978), G.I. Samurai (1979), Shadow Warriors (1980), and Samurai Reincarnation (1981). He was not only actor in but also stunt coordinator for G.I. Samurai, Burning Brave (1981), and Shogun's Shadow (1989). He was executive producer and director for Yellow Fangs (1990) and also directed and starred in Oyaji (2007).

Chiba portrayed Yagyū Jūbei Mitsuyoshi multiple times, first in the 1978 film Shogun's Samurai and in its TV series remake The Yagyu Conspiracy, which aired from 1978 to 1979.
He then appeared as Jūbei in the TV series Yagyū Abaretabi, which aired from 1980 to 1981 and in the 1981 film Samurai Reincarnation (Makai Tensho) and its theatrical musical version Yagyu Jubei Makai Tensho. He then reprised his role as Jūbei in the second season of Yagyū Abaretabi, this time entitled Yagyū Jūbei Abaretabi, which aired from 1982 to 1983. A few years later he returned to play Jūbei in Iemitsu, Hikoza, and Isshin Tasuke: A National Crisis, a TV movie that aired in 1989. His final appearance as Jūbei was in 2 direct-to-DVD films entitled Sarutobi Sasuke and the Army of Darkness 3: Wind Chapter and Sarutobi Sasuke and the Army of Darkness 4: Fire Chapter in 2005. Other notable Japanese television roles for Chiba were the ninja leaders Hattori Hanzō III, Tsuge Shinpachi, Tarao Hanzō, and Hattori Hanzō XV across multiple seasons of the Shadow Warriors TV series and Hattori Hanzō I in the 2003 direct-to-DVD series follow-up Shin Kage no Gundan (New Shadow Warriors).

Chiba was even busier in the 1980s, doing dozens of movies as well as making forays into television, and with roles in such high-profile adventures as the popular Hong Kong comic-based movie The Storm Riders (1998), starring alongside Ekin Cheng and Aaron Kwok. His fame in Japan remained unabated into the 1990s.

In his fifties, the actor resumed working as a choreographer of martial arts sequences. At the dawn of the 21st century, Chiba was as busy as ever in feature films and also starring in his own series in Japan. Roles in Takashi Miike's Deadly Outlaw: Rekka and his work with directors Kenta and Kinji Fukasaku in Battle Royale II effectively bridged the gap between modern day and yesteryear cinematic cult legends. Chiba's enduring onscreen career received a tribute when he appeared in a key role as Hattori Hanzo, the owner of a sushi restaurant and retired samurai sword craftsman, in director Quentin Tarantino's bloody revenge epic Kill Bill: Volume I in 2003.

Chiba starred in more than 125 films for Toei Studios and has won numerous awards in Japan for his acting.

Personal life and death 
Chiba divorced his first wife, actress Yōko Nogiwa, with whom he had a daughter, Juri Manase, who is also an actress. He had two sons from his second marriage to Tamami Chiba.

His younger brother, Jirō Yabuki (also known as Jiro Chiba), was also an actor.

In early August 2021, Chiba became ill with COVID-19 Delta variant. Initially, he was treated at home, but was hospitalized a few days later on 8 August when he developed pneumonia. He died on 19 August 2021, at the age of 82. Chiba had not been vaccinated, according to his agency. His body was cremated at the crematorium on 20 August 2021.

In Western popular culture
Christian Slater's character Clarence Worley in True Romance is a fan of Chiba. In a pivotal early scene he watches a Sonny Chiba triple feature. The writer of True Romance, Quentin Tarantino, worked with Chiba ten years later in Kill Bill: Volume I.

A modified version of the opening scroll to the English-language version of 1973 movie Karate Kiba (English title: The Bodyguard) was used in the script of Quentin Tarantino's 1994 movie Pulp Fiction. Tarantino's script changed the Ezekiel 25:17 speech, swapping out "I am Chiba the Bodyguard" for "my name is the Lord".

The character Takayuki Chiba from the shōnen manga series Kengan Ashura is based upon Chiba and Hiroyuki Sanada.

Martial arts ranks 
Chiba held black belts in the following martial arts:
 Kyokushin Karate: 4th Dan
 Togakure-ryū Ninpō Taijutsu: 4th Dan
 Goju-ryu karate: 2nd Dan
 Shorinji Kempo: 2nd Dan
 Judo: 2nd Dan
 Kendo: 1st Dan

Filmography

Films

Television

Shorts

Theater

References

Bibliography

External links 

 
 Sonny Chiba official blog
 
 Henshin Online: Sonny Chiba
 Sonny Chiba on 10kbullets.com 
 Sonny Chiba on GooHead 
 Five Things You Didn't Know About Sonny Chiba

1939 births
2021 deaths
20th-century Japanese male actors
21st-century Japanese male actors
Japanese male judoka
Japanese male karateka
Japanese kendoka
Japanese ninjutsu practitioners
People from Fukuoka
People from Kimitsu
Kyokushin kaikan practitioners
Gōjū-ryū practitioners
Deaths from the COVID-19 pandemic in Japan